Matthew Haynes Vogel (born June 3, 1957) is an American former competition swimmer, Olympic gold medalist, and former world record-holder.  He competed at the 1976 Summer Olympics in Montreal where he received gold medals in the 100-meter butterfly, and the 4×100-meter medley relay.

Vogel set one world record during his career, in 4×100-meter medley relay.

Vogel was formerly the head coach of Coastal Maine Aquatics in Cape Elizabeth, Maine.  Before coaching at CMA he was the head coach of Fort Wayne Aquatics, and prior to that he head coached the Canoe City Swim Club in Old Town, Maine. 

Vogel was inducted as an "honor swimmer" into the International Swimming Hall of Fame in 1996.

See also
 List of members of the International Swimming Hall of Fame
 List of Olympic medalists in swimming (men)
 List of University of Tennessee people
 World record progression 4 × 100 metres medley relay

References

External links
 

1957 births
Living people
American male butterfly swimmers
World record setters in swimming
Olympic gold medalists for the United States in swimming
Sportspeople from Fort Wayne, Indiana
Swimmers at the 1976 Summer Olympics
Tennessee Volunteers men's swimmers
Medalists at the 1976 Summer Olympics
Swimmers from Indiana
20th-century American people
21st-century American people